Senator Finney may refer to:

Darwin Abel Finney (1814–1868), Pennsylvania State Senate
David Wesley Finney (1839–1916), Kansas State Senate
Louis C. H. Finney (Virginian) (1822–1884), Virginia State Senate
Lowe Finney (born 1975), Tennessee State Senate
Raymond Finney (born 1941), Tennessee State Senate

See also
Senator Finley (disambiguation)